Chattergam is a village in B.K pora block of district Budgam of the Jammu and Kashmir. It is 11 km away from the Srinagar and 16 km from the district Budgam. Postal Head Office of Chattergam is Chadoora and its pincode is 191113.

Demographics 
As per the census of 2011, its total population was 3548, of which males are 1667 and 1881 are females.

See also
Srinagar
Dooniwari
Bagati Kani Pora

References

External links 
Kashmir Valley

Villages in Budgam district